"Hunny Hunny"/"Chatterbox (Pt. 2)" is the twelfth single released by the American synthpop band Book of Love. The single is a double A-side single, and was released on September 23, 1993, as the second single from the band's fourth album Lovebubble.

"Hunny Hunny" was written by band member Ted Ottaviano, and "Chatterbox (Pt. 2)" by Jade Lee and Ted Ottaviano; the latter was a spoken word commentary featuring the two members.

"Hunny Hunny" was remixed by Ben Grosse into seven different remixes for the singles. The song "Chatterbox (Pt. 2)" was remixed into five different remixes by Tony Garcia and Guido Osorio.

Track listings

1993 12" Maxi-Single (Sire Records 9 41052-0)
Side A:
"Hunny Hunny" (Sweet & Sticky Mix) - 5:39
"Hunny Hunny" (Sweet & Sticky Dub) - 5:34
"Hunny Hunny" (Tribal Rock Mix) - 5:04
"Hunny Hunny" (Tribal Rock Edit) - 4:01
Side B:
"Chatterbox (Pt. 2)" (Late Nite Chat Mix) - 5:45
"Chatterbox (Pt. 2)" (Unspoken Dub) - 5:47
"Chatterbox (Pt. 2)" (Translator Mix) - 6:11
"Chatterbox (Pt. 2)" (Translator Instrumental) - 6:26

1993 CD Maxi-Single (Sire Records 9 41052-2)
"Hunny Hunny" (Radio Remix) - 4:09
"Chatterbox (Pt. 2)" (Album Version) - 3:32
"Hunny Hunny" (Sweet & Sticky Mix) - 5:39
"Chatterbox (Pt. 2)" (Translator Mix) - 6:11
"Hunny Hunny" (Tribal Rock Mix) - 5:04
"Chatterbox (Pt. 2)" (Late Nite Chat Mix) - 5:45
"Chatterbox (Pt. 2)" (Translator Instrumental) - 6:26
"Hunny Hunny" (Sweet & Sticky Edit) - 3:47
"Chatterbox (Pt. 2)" (Late Nite Chat Edit) - 4:00
"Chatterbox (Pt. 1)" (Album Version) - 1:09

1993 "Hunny Hunny" Cassette Single (Sire Records 9 18388-4)
Side A: "Hunny Hunny" (Radio Remix) - 4:09
Side B: "Hunny Hunny" (Album Version) - 4:05

1993 "Hunny Hunny" Promo CD Single (Sire Records PRO-CD-6332)
"Hunny Hunny" (Radio Remix) - 4:09
"Hunny Hunny" (Sweet & Sticky Edit) - 3:47
"Hunny Hunny" (Album Version) - 4:05

1993 "Hunny Hunny" Promo 12" Single Sire Records PRO-A-6332)
Side A:
"Hunny Hunny" (Sweet & Sticky Mix) - 5:39
"Hunny Hunny" (Sweet & Sticky Dub) - 5:34
"Hunny Hunny" (Sweet & Sticky Edit) - 3:47
Side B:
"Hunny Hunny" (Tribal Rock Mix) - 5:04
"Hunny Hunny" (Tribal Rock Edit) - 4:01
"Hunny Hunny" (Radio Remix) - 4:09

1993 European "Hunny Hunny" (Special DJ Edit) CD Maxi-Single (Sire Records W 0212CD DJ)
"Hunny Hunny" (Radio Remix Edit) - 3:30
"Hunny Hunny" (Sweet & Sticky Edit) - 3:47
"Hunny Hunny" (Sweet & Sticky Mix) - 5:39
"Chatterbox (Pt. 2)" (Late Night Chat Mix) - 5:45

Personnel 
"Hunny Hunny" written by Ted Ottaviano. "Chatterbox (Pt. 2)" written by Jade Lee and Ted Ottaviano. "Chatterbox (Pt. 1)" written by Jade Lee. All instruments arranged, programmed, and performed by Book of Love.

 Lauren Roselli - Keyboards, backing vocals, lead vocals on "Hunny Hunny"
 Ted Ottaviano - Keyboards
 Jade Lee - Keyboards, Percussion, backing vocals, lead vocals on "Chatterbox (Pt. 2)" & "Chatterbox (Pt. 1)"
 Susan Ottaviano - Vocals

Credits
 Produced by Ted Ottaviano.
 "Hunny Hunny"Mix and Additional Production: Ben Grosse.Mixes and Additional Recording done at Pearl Sound Studios, Canton, MI.Assisted by Dave Skryznski and Bill Bingham.Programming on 'Sweet & Sticky Mix', 'Sweet and Sticky Edit', and 'Sweet & Sticky Dub' by Ben Grosse and The Funky Bass Team.Programming on 'Tribal Rock Mix' and 'Tribal Rock Edit' by Ben Grosse and John Vitale.Guitars on 'Radio Remix' and 'Radio Remix Edit' by Curtis Mathewson.
 "Chatterbox (Pt. 2)"Additional Production by Tony Garcia for MCT.Remixed by Tony Garcia and Guido Osorio for MCT.
 Design: David Harlan and Heather Laurie

Official versions

" * " denotes that version is available as digital download

References

External links
 Official Book of Love discography

Book of Love (band) songs
1993 singles
House music songs
Techno songs
Spoken word
1993 songs
Sire Records singles